The R-46 was an intercontinental ballistic missile (ICBM) design by the Soviet Union during the Cold War.

The R-46 concept was to launch a very large hydrogen bomb into orbit as a fractional orbital bombardment system (FOBS).  The existence of the system was alluded to in a speech by then Soviet Premier Nikita Khrushchev in 1961.  The design was not developed, however, and the FOBS concept was abandoned as part of SALT II.

See also 
 8K69, the first Soviet fractional orbital bombardment system
 List of missiles
 List of rockets

Cold War intercontinental ballistic missiles of the Soviet Union
Abandoned military projects of the Soviet Union
R-046